Abdou Pape Badji (born 4 April 1992) is a Senegalese professional basketball player who last played for Phoenix Brussels of the BNXT League. He represents the Senegalese national team, where he participated at the 2014 FIBA Basketball World Cup.

Professional career
On 5 June 2018, Badji signed with Champagne Châlons-Reims Basket of the French Pro A.

On 11 June 2020, he has signed with Okapi Aalst of the Pro Basketball League.

National team career
In summer 2013 he participated with the Senegal National team at the 2013 FIBA Africa Championship, where they finished in the 3rd position.

In 2014, he played in the 2014 FIBA Basketball World Cup. Senegal reached the eightfinals, where they lost again Spain. Badji scored 12 points and collected 7 rebounds in that game, against players such as Pau Gasol, Marc Gasol or Serge Ibaka.

In summer 2015 he's also been selected with the Senegal National team to play in the 2015 FIBA Africa Championship.

References

External links
Video highlights - 2014 FIBA World Cup

1992 births
Living people
2014 FIBA Basketball World Cup players
Brussels Basketball players
Champagne Châlons-Reims Basket players
Kangoeroes Basket Mechelen players
Okapi Aalstar players
Power forwards (basketball)
SAM Basket players
SAV Vacallo Basket players
Senegalese expatriate basketball people in Belgium
Senegalese expatriate basketball people in France
Senegalese expatriate basketball people in Switzerland
Senegalese men's basketball players
Small forwards
Union Neuchâtel Basket players